James Duncan McCrimmon (born May 29, 1953) is a Canadian former professional ice hockey defenceman who played two games in the National Hockey League for the St. Louis Blues. He also played 114 games in the World Hockey Association with the Edmonton Oilers and Calgary Cowboys.

McCrimmon was born in Ponoka, Alberta.

External links

1953 births
Baltimore Clippers players
Canadian ice hockey defencemen
Calgary Cowboys players
Edmonton Oilers (WHA) draft picks
Edmonton Oilers (WHA) players
Ice hockey people from Alberta
Living people
Los Angeles Kings draft picks
Medicine Hat Tigers players
Mohawk Valley Comets (NAHL) players
People from Ponoka, Alberta
Providence Reds players
Richmond Wildcats players
St. Louis Blues players
Kimberley Dynamiters players
Winston-Salem Polar Twins (SHL) players